William F. Burt (born in Deming, New Mexico) is an American politician and a Republican member of the New Mexico Senate representing District 33 since January 15, 2013. Burt served consecutively in the District 40 seat from his appointment January 14, 2011 by Governor of New Mexico Susana Martinez to fill the vacancy caused by the resignation of Senator Dianna Duran, who was elected Secretary of State until the end of the legislative session.

Education
Burt earned his bachelor's degree from New Mexico State University.

Elections
2012 Redistricted to District 33, and with retiring incumbent Republican Senator Rod Adair retiring, Burt was unopposed for the June 5, 2012 Republican Primary, winning with 3,954 votes; and won the November 6, 2012 General election with 12,292 votes (65.3%) against Democratic nominee Stephanie Dubois.

References

External links
Official page at the New Mexico Legislature

Bill Burt at Ballotpedia
William F. Burt at the National Institute on Money in State Politics

Year of birth missing (living people)
Living people
Republican Party New Mexico state senators
New Mexico State University alumni
People from Alamogordo, New Mexico
People from Deming, New Mexico
21st-century American politicians